Google Currents, formerly known as Google+ for G Suite, is software developed by Google for internal enterprise communication. It is one of many products that constitute the Google Workspace line of products.

Google Currents is different from the defunct Google app of the same name, which provided users with access to an electronic library of magazines from 2011 to 2013. It will be replaced by the Spaces feature in Google Chat in 2023.

History and development
Originally called Google+ for G Suite, Currents is the sole remnant of Google's defunct social network Google+, which the company shut down entirely for personal and brand use on April 2, 2019.

As of June 2020, Google Currents is in Public Beta for Google Workspace clients. A free trial can be requested.

On February 10, 2022, Google announced that it would be planning to "wind down" Google Currents and transition its users to the Spaces feature in Google Chat the next year.

See also 
 Google Wave
 Google Buzz
 Google+, the defunct and formerly related social network
 Google Currents (2011–2013), the unrelated discontinued news app
 Yammer, an analogous private social network for Microsoft 365 and Office 365 customers

References

External links 
 

Currents
IOS software
Android (operating system) software